The Indian Army had no standby force ready in 1971 with the specific task of attacking East Pakistan, one of the many reasons why India did not immediately intervene after Pakistan launched Operation Searchlight in March 1971. Indian Army's Eastern Command was tasked with defending the northern and eastern borders and fighting the insurgencies in Nagaland, Mizoram and Naxalites in West Bengal at that time.

Mukti Bahini, aided by the Indian army through Operation Jackpot, led the struggle against the Pakistan Army while the Indian Army readied for intervention. General M. A. G. Osmani, Commander-in-Chief Bangladesh Forces, had divided Mukti Bahini forces into 11 geographical sectors for command and control purpose. Mukti Bahini forces numbered 30,000 regular soldiers (including 3 brigades containing 8 infantry battalions and 3 artillery batteries) and at least 100,000 guerrillas by December 1971.

The Indian Army Eastern Command assembled two existing infantry corps, the IV Corps and the XXXIII Corps, for operations in Bangladesh, and created a new corps (II Corps) besides reorganising the 101 Communication Zone as a combat formation. On 21 November 1971, the Indian and Bangladesh forces were put under a joint command structure India Bangladesh force in the eastern theatre, led by Lieutenant General Jagjit Singh Aurora, and this force came to be known as Mitro Bahini. In addition to 29 battalions of the Border Security Force (BSF), Mukti Bahini guerrillas operating near the border or awaiting deployment in camps inside India were organised into infantry companies and attached to various Indian formations.

Indian Army Eastern Command
HQ: Fort William, Kolkata

GOC-in-C (Indian Army): Lieutenant General Jagjit Singh Aurora
COS: Major General JFR Jacob
Director Military Operations: Major General Inderjit Singh Gill, MC
Director Operation Jackpot: Lieutenant General B.N. 'Jimmy' Sirkar  
Bangladesh Forces Liaison: Group Captain A.K. Khandkar, HQ: 8, Theater Road, Kolkata

Units attached to Eastern Command but outside Bangladesh operational area:
From IV Corps: 
2nd Infantry Division in North eastern border
5th Infantry Division in North eastern border

From XXXIII Corps:
17th Mountain division in Sikkim
27th Mountain division in Kalimpong, North Bengal

Airborne forces attached to Eastern Command:
50th (Independent) Parachute Brigade CO: Brigadier Mathew Thomas
2nd battalion Parachute Regiment (2 Para) (in airborne role) CO: Lieutenant Colonel Kulwant Singh Pannu
7th battalion Parachute Regiment (7 Para) CO: Lieutenant Colonel RP Singh (KIA)
8th battalion Parachute Regiment (8 Para) CO: Lieutenant Colonel Afsir Karim
17 Para Field Regiment CO: Lieutenant Colonel Khanna
60 Para Medical Company CO: Lieutenant Colonel M Kumar

Eastern Command Reserve:
6th Mountain division less brigade HQ: Cooch Bihar GOC: Major General P.C. Reddy
2 Engineer Regiments and bomb disposal group

Bengal Area
GOC: Major General J.P. Chowdhury HQ: Kolkata
1st battalion 3rd Gurkha Rifles (1/3 GR)
11th battalion Bihar Regiment (11 Bihar)
12th battalion Garhwal Rifles (12 Garh Rif)
Engineers and bomb disposal units

Western Sector
Area of Operation: Khulna, Jessore, Kushtia and Faridpur districts

II Corps
GOC: Lieutenant General T.N. 'Tappy' Raina HQ: Krishnanagar, West Bengal
50th (Independent) Parachute Brigade – Brig M. Thomas, less 2 Para battalion group in airborne role
8th  Mountain Artillery Brigade  
58th, 68th and 263rd Engineering Regiments

9th Infantry Division
GOC: Major General Dalbir Singh
32 Infantry Brigade – Brigadier M Tewari
42 Infantry Brigade – Brigadier J. M. Jhoria
350 Infantry Brigade – Brigadier H. S. Sandhu
9th Artillery Brigade
45th Cavalry (PT-76s) 
102nd Engineer Regiment
Mukti Bahini Sector #9  – Major Jalil

4th Mountain Division
GOC: Major General M.S. BararHQ: Krishnanagar
7th Mountain Brigade – Brigadier Zail Singh
41st Mountain Brigade – Brigadier Tony Michigan
62nd Mountain Brigade - Brigadier Rajinder Nath 
4th Mountain Artillery Brigade
Mukti Bahini Sector #8 – Lieutenant Colonel M.A. Manzoor

North Western Sector
Area of Operation: Rajshahi, Bogra, Dinajpur and Rangpur districts

Corps: XXXIII
GOC: Lieutenant General M. L. ThapanHQ: Siliguri, West Bengal
Corps Artillery Brigade
471st Engineering Brigade – Colonel Suri
235th Engineering Regiment
2 Para battalion Group in airborne role to parachute over Tangail to capture Poongli Bridge on 11 Dec, Bn gp consisting of:
A field battery of 17 Para Field Regiment
A section of 411 Para Field Company
A surgical team of 60 Para Medical Company
MF Brigade – Brigadier Prem Singh
Mukti Bahini Sector #7 – Lieutenant Colonel Q.N. Zaman
71st Mountain Brigade – Brigadier P. N. Kathpalia
Mukti Bahini Sector #6 – Wing Commander Mohammad K. Bashar

20th Mountain Division
GOC: Maj. Gen. Lachman SinghHQ: Balurghat, West Bengal
66th Mountain Brigade – Brigadier G. S. Sharma
165th Mountain Brigade – Brigadier R. S. Pannu
202nd Mountain Brigade – Brigadier F. P. Bhatty
3rd Armoured Brigade (63rd Cavalry (T-55s) and 69th Armoured Regiment (PT-76s) – Brigadier G. Singh Sidhu
20th Mountain Artillery Brigade
13th Engineering Regiment
340th Mountain Brigade Group – Brigadier Joginder Singh
97th Mountain Regiment

6th Mountain Division
(Eastern Command HQ Reserve)
GOC: Major General P. C. ReddyHQ: Cooch Bihar, West Bengal
9th Mountain Brigade – Brigadier Tirit Varma
99th Mountain Brigade - 
6th Mountain Artillery Brigade
51st Engineer Regiment

North Eastern Sector
Area of Operation: Mymensingh and Tangail districts

101st Communication Zone
GOC: Major General Gurbax Singh GilHQ: Guwahati, Assam
312 Air Defence Brigade
342 Independent Air Defence Brigade
56th Mountain Regiment plus Engineers
95th Mountain Brigade – Brigadier Hardev Singh Kler
FJ Sector Brigade – Brigadier Sant Singh
Mukti Bahini Sector #11 – Lieutenant Colonel Abu Taher
167th Infantry Brigade – Brigadier Irani (allotted after 8 December 1971)
5th Mountain Brigade (allotted after 8 December 1971)

Eastern Sector
Area of Operation: Sylhet, Comilla, Noakhali & Chittagong districts

IV Corps
GOC Lieutenant General Sagat SinghHQ: Agartala, Tripura
IV Corps Artillery Brigade
Three Independent Tank Squadrons
4th, 62nd, 234th Engineer Regiments and support elements

8th Mountain Division
GOC: Major General K. V. Krishna Rao
Echo Force Brigade – Brigadier Wadeker
Mukti Bahini Sector #5 – Major Mir Shawkat Ali 
59th Mountain Brigade – Brigadier C. A. Quinn
81st Mountain Brigade – Brigadier R. C. V. Apte 
2nd Mountain Artillery Brigade 
Mukti Bahini Sector #4 – Lieutenant Colonel C.R. Dutta

57th Mountain Division
GOC: Major General B.F. Gonsalves
Mukti Bahini S Force Brigade – Lieutenant Colonel K.M. Shafiullah
311th Mountain Brigade – Brigadier Mishra
73rd Mountain Brigade – Brigadier Tuli
61st Mountain Brigade – Brigadier Tom Pande
57th Mountain Artillery Brigade 
Mukti Bahini Sector #3 – Maj. A. N. Nuruzzaman
Mukti Bahini Sector #2 – Maj. A.T.M Haider
15th Engineering Regiment

23rd Mountain Division
GOC: Major General R.D. Hira
301st Mountain Brigade – Brigadier H. S. Sodhi
181st Mountain Brigade – Brigadier Y. C. Bakshi
83rd Mountain Brigade – Brigadier B. S. Sandhu 
23rd Mountain Artillery Brigade
Kilo Force Brigade – Brigadier Ananda Swaroop containing: 
Mukti Bahini Sector #1 – Major Rafiqul Islam
Mukti Bahini K Force Brigade – Major Salek Chowdhury
Mizo Range Hills Brigade

Indian Navy Eastern Fleet
FOC-in-C: Vice Admiral Nilakanta KrishnanHQ: Vishakhapatnam, Andhra Pradesh
FOCEF: Rear Admiral S. H. Sarma
A liaison officer from the Navy was posted at Fort William to coordinate matters with the Army Eastern Command. The fleet was at its peacetime standing when radio intercepts warned of PNS Ghazi entering the Bay of Bengal.  and part of the Eastern Fleet was moved to the Andamans as a result.

 – Captain Swaraj Parkash (Majestic-class light aircraft carrier)
INS Brahmaputra – Captain J.C. Puri (Leopard-class frigate)
INS Beas – Captain L. Ramdas (Leopard-class frigatee)
INS Kamorta – Captain M.P. Awati (Petya-class frigate)
INS Kavaratti - Captain S. Paul (Petya-class frigate)
INS Rajput – Lieutenant Commander Inder Singh (destroyer)
INS Kalvari –        (submarine)
INS Khandari – Commander R. J. Milan (submarine)
INS Panvel – Lieutenant Commander G.R. Naroha (gunboat)
INS Pulikat – Lieutenant Commander S. Krishnnan (gunboat) 
INS Panaji – Lieutenant Commander R. Gupta (gunboat)
INS Akshay – Lieutenant Commander S.D. Moore (gunboat) 
INS Guldar – Lieutenant Commander U. Dabir (landing ship)
INS Gharial – Lieutenant Commander A.K. Sharma (landing ship)
INS Maggar – Lieutenant Commander A.T.N. Singhal (landing ship)

Bangladesh Navy
Two gunboats under Indian officers and crewed by Bengali seamen were engaged in Operation Hotpants prior to 3 December 1971, harassing merchant traffic to East Pakistan and laying mines on the waterways. After 6 December, when the Indian government recognised Bangladesh as a sovereign nation, the crew wore uniforms of their respective organisations. 
Squadron CO: Commander M.N.R. Samant (On deputation from Indian Navy)
BNS Palash –  Lieutenant Commander J.K. Rai Chowdhury (Indian Navy) (gunboat)
BNS Padma – Lieutenant S.K. Mitter (On deputation from Indian Navy) (gunboat)

Indian Air Force Eastern Air Command

AOC-in-C: Air Marshal H. C. Dewan, Temporary advanced HQ at Fort William
Prior to 1971, Indian Air Force had two command centers dealing with the East, Eastern Air Command (HQ Shillong) responsible for the North Eastern Border, and the Central Air Command (HQ Allahabad), looking after areas south of the Ganges river. 
Air Chief Marshal Pratap Chandra Lal formed an advance HQ at Fort William after consultation with Major General Jacob to coordinate operations with the army before the start of the war.

Western Sector:
No. 7 Squadron IAF (Battle Axes): Hawker Hunter F. MK 56 and 2 F. MK 1 - Bagdogra (WC  Ceolho, then WC Suri). The squadron was moved Chamb after 12 December.
No. 14 Squadron IAF (Bulls): Hawker Hunter F. MK 56 - Kalaikudda (WC Sundersan) - Fighter
No. 16 Squadron IAF (Rattlers): Canberra - Kalaikudda - (WC Gautum) - Bomber
No. 22 Squadron IAF (Swifts): Folland Gnat MK 1 Dum Dum, then Kalaikudda, then Calcutta (WC Sikand)
No. 30 Squadron IAF (Charging Rhinos): Mig 21 FL - Kalaikudda (WC Chudda) - Interceptor
No. 221 Squadron IAF (Valiants): Su-7 BMK - Panagarh (WC Sridharan) – Fighter/Bomber
No. 104 Helicopter Squadron, IAF (Alluitte 3) and (Mi-4) Helicopter

North East and North Western Sector:
AOC-in-C: Air Vice Marshal Devasher HQ: Shillong
No. 4 Squadron IAF (Oorials): Mig 21 FL  -  Gauhati (Wing Commander JV Gole)
No. 15 Squadron IAF (Flying Lancers): Folland Gnat - Gauhati then Agortala (WC Singh)
No. 17 Squadron IAF (Golden Arrows): Hawker Hunter F MK 56 - Hashimara (WC Chatrath)
No. 37 Squadron IAF (Black Panthers): Hawker Hunter F MK 10 - Hashimara (WC Kaul)
No. 24 Squadron IAF (Hunting Hawks): Folland Gnat Gauhati (WC Bhadwar)
No. 28 Squadron IAF (First Supersonics): Mig 21FL Gauhati (WC Bishnu)
No. 105 Helicopter Unit, IAF (Mi-4) and No. 121 Helicopter Flight, IAF (Alouette III) - Agartala

Bangladesh Air Force: Kilo Flight 
CO: Flight Lieutenant Sultan Mahmud HQ: Dimapur, Nagaland, then Agartala
This unit was formed by Bengali pilots and technicians defecting from the Pakistan Air Force. Flying light aircraft donated by India, they launched attacks on depots and communication lines on 2 December 1971, before the start of the war. The unit relocated to Agartala and then Shamshernagar after 3 December 1971.

See also
 Pakistan Army order of battle, December 1971
 Evolution of Pakistan Eastern Command plan
 Military plans of the Bangladesh Liberation War
 Timeline of the Bangladesh Liberation War
 Indo-Pakistani wars and conflicts

References

Sources

Bangladesh Liberation War